(385185) 1993 RO is a plutino. It was the first plutino discovered after Pluto itself, with 1993 RP and (15788) 1993 SB a day and two days later, respectively. The discovery was made in 1993 at the Mauna Kea Observatory with a 2.2-meter telescope. Very little is known about (385185) 1993 RO. Even the diameter estimate of ~90 km is based on the assumed albedo of 0.09.

KBO's found in 1993 include: (15788) 1993 SB, (15789) 1993 SC, (181708) 1993 FW, and (385185) 1993 RO.

See also

List of trans-Neptunian objects
Kuiper belt

References

External links 
 IAUC 5865: 1993 RO
 Further MPEC
 Further MPEC
 List of known TNOs, including size estimates
 IAU minor planet lists
 

385185
Discoveries by David C. Jewitt
Discoveries by Jane Luu
19930914